GNR Class C1 may refer to either of the following classes of railway locomotive designed for the Great Northern Railway by Henry Ivatt:

 GNR Class C1 (large boiler), 94 locomotives introduced from 1902, later LNER Class C1
 GNR Class C1 (small boiler), 22 locomotives introduced from 1898, later LNER Class C2

See also
 GNR Class C2, later LNER Class C12